Adenylate kinase 2 is an enzyme that is encoded in humans by the AK2 gene. The AK2 protein is found in the intermembrane space of the mitochondrion.

Function 

Adenylate kinases are involved in regulating the adenine nucleotide composition within a cell by catalyzing the reversible transfer of phosphate groups among adenine nucleotides. Three isozymes of adenylate kinase, namely 1, 2, and 3, have been identified in vertebrates; this gene encodes isozyme 2. Expression of these isozymes is tissue-specific and developmentally regulated. Isozyme 2 is localized in the mitochondrial intermembrane space and may play a role in apoptosis. Two transcript variants encoding distinct isoforms have been identified for this gene.

AK2 deficiency 
Adenylate Kinase 2 (AK2) deficiency in humans causes hematopoietic defects associated with sensorineural deafness. Reticular dysgenesis is an autosomal recessive form of human combined immunodeficiency.  It is also characterized by an impaired lymphoid maturation and early differentiation arrest in the myeloid lineage.  AK2 deficiency results in absent or a large decrease in the expression of proteins.  AK2 is specifically expressed in the stria vascularis of the inner ear which indicates why individuals with an AK2 deficiency will have sensorineural deafness.

References

External links

Further reading

EC 2.7.4